Ribas may refer to:

 Manoel Ribas, municipality in the state of Paraná, Brazil
 Mission Ribas, Venezuelan Bolivarian mission
 Ribas do Rio Pardo, municipality in the state of Mato Grosso do Sul, Brazil
 Ribas de Campos, municipality in the province of Palencia, Castile and León, Spain
 Ribas de Sil, town in the province of Lugo, Spain

People 
 Andrés Pérez De Ribas (1576–1655), Spanish Jesuit missionary and historian
 Andreson Dourado Ribas (b. 1985), Brazilian football player
 Antoni Ribas (1935–2007), Catalan Spanish film director and screenwriter
 Arthur Bernardes Ribas da Silva Filho (b. 1955), Brazilian football manager
 Biel Ribas (b. 1985), Spanish footballer
 Diego Sebastián Ribas (b. 1980), Uruguayan footballer
 Diego Ribas da Cunha (b. 1985), Brazilian footballer
 Fernando Ribas-Dominicci (1952–1986), F-111F pilot in the United States Air Force
 Francisco José Ribas (1764–1828), Venezuelan philosopher
 Jaume Giró i Ribas (born 1964), Catalan corporate executive
 José de Ribas (1749–1800), Russian admiral of Spanish-Irish origin
 José Félix Ribas (1775–1815), Venezuelan independence leader
 Julio César Ribas (b. 1957), Uruguayan association football manager and former footballer
 Mariona Ribas (b. 1984), Spanish actress
 Óscar Ribas (1909–2004), Angolan writer
 Òscar Ribas Reig (b. 1936), first prime minister of Andorra
 Pau Ribas (b. 1987), Spanish-Catalan basketball player
 Sebastián Ribas (b. 1988), Uruguay football striker
 Tomaz Ribas (1918–1999), Portuguese writer, ethnologist and critic of theatre and dance
 Toni Ribas (b. 1975), Spanish pornographic actor and director

See also 
 Riba (disambiguation)
 José Félix Ribas Municipality (disambiguation), several places
Saribas